Moshe Brawer (‎; 3 November 1919 – 28 December 2020)  was an Israeli geographer. In 2002, he won the Israel Prize in geography. Brawer was the author of The Atlas of the World, an Israeli textbook published in 67 editions. He also compiled 20 other atlases in different languages.

Biography
Moshe Brawer was born in Vienna, Austria. His grandfather was Rabbi Meir Meirson, one of the leaders of the Vienna Jewish community. His father was Abraham Jacob Brawer, a geographer and historian. His mother Sarah taught French in public schools. The family moved to Jerusalem in 1920, when Brawer was a year old.

Brawer studied mathematics at the Hebrew University of Jerusalem, and obtained a PhD in geography from the University of London. His thesis was on the boundaries of Palestine.

Brawer was married to Rina Arison, sister of Ted Arison, who has a controlling interest in Bank Hapoalim.

Awards and recognition
In 2002, Brawer was awarded the Israel Prize for his contributions to the Geography of Israel.

External links
 David Newman: Learning from Past Generations: In Memory of Professor Moshe Brawer. (The Times of Israel, Dec. 31, 2020)

References

1919 births
2020 deaths
Hebrew University of Jerusalem alumni
Alumni of the University of London
Austrian emigrants to Mandatory Palestine
Austrian Jews
Israeli centenarians
Men centenarians
Israeli geographers
Israeli people of Austrian-Jewish descent
Israel Prize recipients